The World's Most Amazing Vacation Rentals is a 2021 American Netflix series following three hosts as they travel the world visiting unique, budget, and luxury vacation properties. Netflix streamed two seasons of the series, which initially premiered on June 18, 2021.

Premise 
Each episode, the shows three host Jo Franco, Megan Batoon, and Luis D. Ortiz   share their top choice for a vacation rental to spend a few nights. Franco's expertise is "Travel" and her goal is to pick the most unique rentals in the world to visit. Ortiz has a background in New York Real Estate and chooses the best Luxury rentals to stay the night. Batoon loves DIY (Do It Yourself) projects and she is tasked with taking the other hosts to the best options for budget vacation rentals.

The three hosts travel across the United States, and abroad to other locals such as Mexico, Japan, and Bali. Never staying at any hotels, their aim is to uncover the best Airbnb and VRBO spots.

Hosts 
JoAnne "Jo" Franco

Megan Batoon

Luis D. Ortiz

References 

English-language Netflix original programming
Travel
Vacation rental